Irakli Gemazashvili (born 6 July 1977) is a Georgia international footballer currently playing for Kickers 94 Markkleeberg.

References

1977 births
Living people
Footballers from Georgia (country)
Georgia (country) international footballers
Expatriate footballers from Georgia (country)
Expatriate footballers in Germany
FC Dinamo Tbilisi players
Hallescher FC players
Association football midfielders
FC Elista players